Lori Daniels (born November 5, 1955) is a former member of the Arizona State Senate. She served in the Senate from January 2001 until January 2003. She ran for re-election in 2002, but lost in the primary to Slade Mead, who would go on to win in the general election.

References

Republican Party Arizona state senators
Women state legislators in Arizona
1955 births
Living people
People from Burlingame, California
People from Chandler, Arizona
21st-century American women